The Newer Volcanics Province is a geological area which is a volcanic field, formed by the East Australia hotspot across south-eastern Australia. The area contains the youngest volcanoes in Australia.

The volcanoes date from the Late-Pleistocene to Holocene ages. The area is characterised by flat lava flows, forming a plain above which rise numerous small scoria cones, tuff rings, and maars. The most recent eruptions in the region took place at Mount Schank and Mount Gambier, estimated about 5000 years BP, when several maars were formed and associated lava flows spread around the cones.

Volcanoes

Prominent volcanoes within the province include:
Mount Schank
Mount Napier
Mount Gambier (including Blue Lake)
Tower Hill
Mount Elephant
Mount Eccles (Budj Bim), with associated Tyrendarra lava flow
Mount Leura
Mount Noorat
Mount Buninyong
Lake Bullen Merri
Lake Purrumbete
Red Rock

Aboriginal Dreamtime connections
History

Three groups of Aboriginal Australians, the Kulin nation in central and western Victoria, the Maar nation on the southwest coast of Victoria and the Bunganditj nation on the South Australian border with Victoria, are the traditional owners of the lands that the NVP is situated on. These Indigenous Australians tell  Dreamtime stories regarding volcanic activity on the Australian continent. These stories act as oral histories of natural events, and can be utilised by modern scientists to understand historical geological and seismic activity on the continent.

Budj Bim

The Gunditjmara people retell the story of their people who witnessed the creation of an important being known as Budj Bim, one of four giant beings who arrived in southeast Australia. While three of these beings strode out to other parts of the continent, one stayed in place; that was Budj Bim. His body transformed into the volcano later given the same name, and his teeth became the lava that transformed the landscape.

Theories and Disagreements

In 1878, Robert B. Smyth, a mining engineer and geologist, raised a question on how Aboriginal Australians get fire. He agreed that there were active volcanoes in Victoria; however, he claimed that there was uncertainty as to whether people actually inhabited that land. However, it was later proven that Smyth had an incomplete idea of Australia's geological past.

See also
 Budj Bim heritage areas
List of volcanoes in Australia

References

Further reading
Articles on Google Scholar

Eruption Points of the Newer Volcanic Province(Agriculture Victoria)

Volcanoes of Australia
Volcanoes of Victoria (Australia)
Volcanoes of South Australia
Maars of Australia
Volcanic fields
Inactive volcanoes
Geologic provinces